D 4 Dance is an Indian dance reality series which premiered on Mazhavil Manorama and has completed five seasons of its series.

Cast

Judges

Hosts

Series & Awards

 Male
 Female
Awards
 Asiavision awards 2016 for Best Anchor- Govind Padmasoorya
 Kerala state television awards   :
 popular TV show - D3
 Best Anchor - Govind Padmasoorya

Season 1 

The first season was titled as D 4 Dance. The show was first aired on 11 April 2014, and its last episode aired on 24 November 2014. It was hosted by Jewel Mary and Sreejith Vijay who was later replaced by Govind Padmasoorya and Pearly Maaney (as Jewel went away for movie shots, she rejoined towards the finale)). There were total of 18 contestants in which Ramzan Muhammed was declared as the winner of the show bagging 50 lakhs Indian Rupees. followed by Aashiq Nawal (2nd place), Swathi Sreeram (3rd place), Ajas N. (4th place), and Dilsha Prasanann (5th place).

Season 2 

The second season of the series was titled as D2 - D 4 Dance. The very first episode on-air was on 5 December 2014 and its final episode was telecasted on 13 September 2015 declaring Pranav Sasidharan as the winner of the season winning 5 Million Indian Rupees followed by Fida Ashraf (2nd place), Saniya Iyappan (3rd place), Suhaid Kukku (4th place), and Arjun Krishna (5th place). The show was hosted by Govind Padmasoorya and Pearle Maaney . Chemistry between Govind Padmasoorya and Pearle Maaney made the show more entertaining. They introduced different kinds of hosting styles to the Indian television. Their chemistry was one of the biggest reason for the high trp rating D2 received. Finale of D2 broke all the rating records of Malayalam television shows from 2014 to 2013. This was the first time a non Asianet show broke the rating records among Malayalam channels. In 2016, 18th Asianet film Award broke the record of D2 Grand finale after one year with various point difference . It was the best season among all D4 dance seasons.

Season 3 

The third season of the series is titled as D3 - D 4 Dance and is hosted by Pearle Maaney and actor Adil Ibrahim. The show was aired on 28 March 2016.
The winner of the third season will be awarded 7.5 Million Indian Rupees as Rs.2.5 million to the each winner of Solo, Duet & Group performers.

The show is directed by Yamuna. The contestants are selected by the auditions in Group, Solo and Duet performance. The show is judged by Priyamani, Neerav Bavlecha and Prasanna Sujit and the series consist of three mentors/vice captains who are all finalists of the previous seasons, Ramzan Muhammed, Pranav Sasidharan and Suhaid Kukku. These judges along with the vice captains are individually leading three teams, Master Rockers - Prasanna Sujit & Suhaid Kukku, Star Challengers - Priyamani & Pranav Sasidharan, Super Heroes - Neerav Bavlecha & Ramzan Muhammed. By the end of each episode, an achievement is given to the contestants as per the categories: Eastern Spicy Performance of The Day, Kalyan Silks Star Dancer of The Day, and Step of the Day

The show claims to be India's first ever dance Reality television series to give a stage for the Transgender people of India.

A few contestants for the solo and duet category were taken into D3 through a wild card entry. The main reason for this was due to the lack of solo contestants after 4th innings.

The first prize for the Solo was won by Nasif Appu with a cash prize of 2.5 million rupees, followed by Anna Prasad. The first prize for the Duet category was won by Ann Mary and Vineesh also having the cash followed by Juhi and Bhavik. The first place for the Group category was won by Aliyans. The second prize was for RC Boys.

Solo

 Nasif Appu (1st)
 Anna Prasad (2nd)
 Nakul Thampi (3rd)
 Remya (4th)

Duet 

 Ann Mary and Vineesh (1st)
 Juhi and Bhavik (2nd)
 Akhil and Ashwin (3rd)
 Raees and Roshan (4th)

Group 

 Aliyans (1st)
 RC Boys (2nd)
 Maramkothees (3rd)
 DR Crew (4th)

Cast 
Vice Captains
 Suhaid Kukku
 Ramzan Muhammed
 Pranav Sasidharan

Season 3 Guest Appearance

 Abhirami Suresh
 Amrutha Suresh
 Arthana Binu
 M G Rajamanickam IAS
 Manu Nair
 Master Chethan
 Nishanthini IPS
 Raj Zachariah
 Sabareesh Prabhakar
 Sruthi Menon
 Sujith Vaassudev
 Sumesh Anand
 Sumesh krishnan
 Vinay Fort
 Avanthika Mohan
 Deepu Karunakaran
 Jayaram
 Kunchacko Boban
 Malavika Wales
 Manju Pillai
 Manju Warrier
 Neha Saxena
 Ramesh Pisharody
 S. Sreesanth
 Shane Nigam
 Shobana
 Suresh Gopi
 Tovino Thomas
 Unni Mukundan
 Vedhika
 Vijay Babu

Innings
1st innings

Dhamaka Group of series - Aliyans
Jodi No 1 - Raees and Roshan
Super Solo - Abhishek Anand

2nd innings

Dhamaka Group of series - RC Boys
Jodi No 1 - Raees and Roshan
Super Solo - Nakul Thampi

3rd innings

Dhamaka Group of series - RC Boys
Jodi No 1 - Raees and Roshan
Super Solo - Nasif Appu

4th  innings

Dhamaka Group of series - Maramkkothees
Jodi No 1 - Ann- Mary and Vineesh
Super Solo - Nasif Appu

5th innings

Dhamaka Group of series - DR crew
Jodi No 1 - Ann Mary and Vineesh
Super Solo - Nasif Appu

6th innings

Dhamaka Group of series - Aliyans
Jodi No 1 - Juhi & Bhavik / Raees & Roshan  
Super Solo - Nasif and Nakul

7th innings

Dhamaka Group of series - Aliyans
Jodi No 1 - Ann Mary and Vineesh 
Super Solo - Nasif Appu

Semi-finals

Dhamaka Group of series - RC boys
Jodi No 1 -Juhi and Bhavik
Super Solo - Nasif Appu

D3 Season entry to final

Dhamaka Group of season - DR crew
Jodi No 1 - Ann Mary and Vineesh 
Super Solo - Anna Prasad

D4 Dance Reloaded 

Titled as D4 Dance Reloaded, is a show consisting of only 15 episodes. Judged by Neerav Bavlecha and Mamta Mohandas and hosted by Pearle Maaney and Adil Ibrahim. This is the fourth instalment in the D4 dance series and the show was aired on 21 November 2016. The super finale of the show was telecast on 20 and 21 December.

This will be the shortest reality show in Malayalam Television which will get over in 15 episodes. Popular contestants of all the 3 seasons of the show will team up as a pair and compete for the title.10 pairs are competing in the show (total 20 contestants) and will be performing for 6 stages and the pair with the highest score at the end of 6 performances will win the title in the Grand Finale which will happen in late 2016. All 10 pairs are trained by 10 different choreographer's who had taken part in earlier seasons.

Malayalam film actress and playback singer Mamta Mohandas and Neerav Bavlecha will judge the show. The show is sponsored by Kajaria Tiles and co-sponsored by Q7 Thinner, Sleepwell My Mattress and Bharthi TMT.

Title winners Dilsha Prasanann and Rinosh Surendren (Choreographer Dileep Kumar) were awarded 1 million rupees by F2 Fashion to You casuals.

Guest Appearance 

 Bhavana
 Lakshmi Gopalaswamy
 Rahman
 Vineeth

Participants 

 Ajith and Swathi
 Arjun and Sanjal
 Bhavik and Shamaz
 Dilsha and Rinosh
 Jerry and Vysakh
 Nakul Thampi and Saniya Iyappan
 Renjini and Sneha
 Rishi and Aradhya
 Shameer and Rakhu
 Sushmita and Dihin
 Vishnu and Anna

Finalists 
 Dilsha and Rinosh (1st)
 Jerry and Vyshakh (2nd)
 Vishnu and Anna (3rd)
 Bhavik and Shamaz (4th)
 Nakul and Saniya (5th)

Season 4
The official fourth season of the series is titled as D4 - D 4 Dance Junior v/s Senior and is hosted by anchor turned actress Alina Padikkal and television actor Rahul Ravi. The show started airing on 1 May 2017. Ankith Madhav initially hosted the show With  Rahul,  from episode 11, Hakha Jafar had replaced Ankit Madhav and later in episode 36, Alina replaced Hakka. 
The winner of the season will be awarded 25 Lakh  Rupees and the second prize winner will get  Rs.10 Lakh. Later, Prasanna Master joined the jury replacing Mamta Mohandas and Anu Sithara.
The final was held on 3 December 2017. The juniors won the series with Saniya receiving the fourth place with a cash prize of 1 lakh from Kajaria tiles, Sajin in third with 5 lakhs from I & u icecreams, second place was for Vaigha bagging 10 lakhs from Q7 thinner and the Winner- Surya with 25 lakhs from Bismi.

Top 4 
 Vaigha
 Ananya
 Saniya
 Sajin

Season 5
The official fifth season of D 4 Dance is launching on the channel from 6 April 2019 on every Saturday-Sunday at 8:00 PM. The show was hosted by RJ Arjun and Vincy Aloshious later replaced by Malavika Krishnadas

 Judges
Prasanna Sujit
Miya George
Paris Laxmi

Winners
 Winner: Chaithik
 First runner-up: Anamika
 Second runner-up: Lakshmi Shaji

References 

Indian reality television series
Dance competition television shows
2014 Indian television series debuts
Indian dance television shows
Malayalam-language television shows
Mazhavil Manorama original programming